Ruttonjee is a Parsi surname. Notable people with the surname include:
Jehangir Hormusjee Ruttonjee (1880–1960), Hong Kong businessman and philanthropist
Dhun Jehangir Ruttonjee (1903–1974), Hong Kong businessman and philanthropist, son of Jehangir

See also
Ruttonjee Hospital, a government hospital in Wan Chai, Hong Kong

Surnames of British Isles origin
Surnames of Indian origin